Mary Jane "MJ" Watson  is a character appearing in American comic books published by Marvel Comics. The character was created by Stan Lee and John Romita Sr., and made her first appearance in The Amazing Spider-Man #25 (June 1965). Since then, she has gone on to become Spider-Man's main love interest and later his wife. Mary Jane is his most famous and prominent love interest due to their long history, as she is also represented in most Spider-Man media and adaptations.

Although she made a brief first appearance in The Amazing Spider-Man #25 with a plant obscuring her exterior, as part of a then-long-running recurring gag about Aunt May attempting to set Peter up with her friend's "nice girl" niece, Mary Jane's first official face reveal was a cameo appearance in The Amazing Spider-Man #42 (November 1966). Designed and drawn by John Romita Sr., her entrance is regarded as one of the most iconic introductions in comic history, owing it to its build-up, her hyper-vibrant red hair and beauty, and her most famous line, "Face it, Tiger... you just hit the jackpot!" Since then, 'Tiger' has been her most recognizable nickname for Peter Parker, spanning comics and media adaptations.

Initially set up by Aunt May as a blind date, redheaded party girl Mary Jane "MJ" Watson was depicted in her early appearances as Gwen Stacy's competition. Though Peter dated her briefly before Gwen, both of them broke it off as Peter saw her flamboyance, flakiness and 'life of the party' personality as shallow and MJ does not want to be tied down by a man. She eventually became Peter's main love interest after Gwen's death at the hands of the Green Goblin. The pair formed a bond, as Mary Jane became a more open-hearted person. She and Peter got closer, fell deeply in love, had an on-off relationship for years and eventually married. Despite their marriage being undone due to the timeline manipulations by the villain Mephisto, Mary Jane and Peter retained a close friendship. They later resumed their romantic relationship for some time and are destined to have a daughter Mayday Parker / Spider-Girl that will end Mephisto's eventual reign over the Earth, whom Mephisto sought to erase from reality.

Since her debut, Mary Jane Watson has been described as one of Marvel's most notable non-powered female heroes, being labelled as an important female love interests in comics.

In film, Kirsten Dunst portrayed the character in Sam Raimi's Spider-Man trilogy, Shailene Woodley had an uncredited silent cameo appearance as the character in the 2014 film The Amazing Spider-Man 2, while Zendaya portrays a reimagined version of the character named Michelle "MJ" Jones-Watson in the Marvel Cinematic Universe; Zoë Kravitz voiced the character in the 2018 animated film Spider-Man: Into the Spider-Verse.

Publication history 
Mary Jane Watson is mentioned in The Amazing Spider-Man #15 (August 1964), and is initially used as a running joke of the series, as Peter Parker's Aunt May repeatedly attempts to set her unwilling nephew up on a date with her. Parker (also known as Spider-Man) consistently worms his way out of meeting Mary Jane who, aside from a brief appearance in #25 (June 1965) with her face obscured, is never actually seen until The Amazing Spider-Man #42 (November 1966). Peter David wrote in 2010 that artist John Romita Sr. "made the definitive statement of his arrival by pulling Mary Jane out from behind the oversized potted plant [that blocked the readers' view of her face in issue #25] and placing her on panel in what would instantly become an iconic moment". Romita has stated that in designing Mary Jane, he "used Ann-Margret from the movie Bye Bye Birdie as a guide, using her coloring, the shape of her face, her red hair and her form-fitting short skirts".

According to co-creator Stan Lee, he and Romita had intended for Gwen Stacy to be Spider-Man's one true love, and introduced Mary Jane "just for fun", but that "somehow, Mary Jane seemed to have all the personality, and much as we tried to make Gwen more attractive, we couldn't! We, ourselves, felt that Mary Jane ended up being not only more beautiful but more fun and more interesting, and we finally decided to let Peter end up with her, but it was... as though the characters had taken over!".

Mary Jane Watson's unexpected popularity with readers after her debut changed the course of the plan for Gwen Stacy's character, who was intended to be the true love for Peter and was characterized as a sweet Daddy's girl in contrast to Mary Jane's '60s counterculture, vampy and liberated personality. Fans surprisingly liked Mary Jane more and demanded for her to replace Gwen's role as Peter Parker's main love interest as readers found Mary Jane more exciting and that "no matter how we [i.e. Lee and his artist/co-plotter collaborators] wrote it, Mary Jane always seemed more interesting!".
The names "Mary Jane" and "MJ" are also common slang terms for marijuana. When asked about this, Stan Lee claimed it was purely coincidental, that he knew nothing about drugs and had never tried marijuana.

Gerry Conway succeeded Stan Lee as writer of The Amazing Spider-Man in 1972. Conway pushed Mary Jane to the forefront of the cast, and made her a serious love interest for Peter Parker. Like Lee, Conway found Mary Jane to be more compelling than Gwen: "[Mary Jane] hadn't lost the edge that made her an interesting character. Gwen didn't have an edge. She was just a nice person. I don't think she had a mean bone in her body, and wasn't likely to do something that was likely to screw things up for Peter, out of some misguided sense of self-aggrandizement, which Mary Jane was quite capable of doing—which makes her a much more interesting character".

In 1987, the character was married to Spider-Man in The Amazing Spider-Man Annual #21. As a consequence, writer J. M. DeMatteis made Mary Jane and her marriage to Spider-Man one of the central themes of the critically acclaimed "Kraven's Last Hunt", published the same year as the wedding. DeMatteis commented that "'Kraven's Last Hunt' has a lot of darkness in it, but the story primarily is about Peter and his journey into the light and the power of simple human love. The reason Peter makes it out is because he has Mary Jane in his life, and that is his salvation".

Marvel editor-in-chief Joe Quesada said that he feels the marriage ages the characters, making them less appealing to young readers, and lessens the dramatic, "soap opera" possibilities, but also stated that "divorcing or widowing, or annulling the marriage... would only be worse". He has also pointed out that the marriage itself was editorially mandated; Stan Lee decided to marry the characters in his daily newspaper strip and, even though the two were not even dating at the time in the comic book series, it was decided to marry them in the regular Marvel Universe as well. In 2007, Quesada presided over the controversial "One More Day" storyline, which he also drew, in which Peter and Mary Jane's marriage is erased from history and everyone's memories by the devil Mephisto. Quesada states he is an avid fan of the Peter and MJ relationship, and in several interviews has claimed that the alternate MC2 universe, in which Peter and Mary Jane are happily married, is a "natural progression" of the characters.

The erasing of Peter and Mary Jane's marriage was initially adopted in the newspaper strip as well, but due to negative reader reaction Lee later revealed it to be a bad dream. Mary Jane remains Spider-Man's wife in the newspaper strip continuity.

Although the marriage stayed erased, Mary Jane and Peter Parker became a couple again during Nick Spencer's run in Amazing Spider-Man. She got a spin-of comic later, The Amazing Mary Jane, by Leah Williams, Carlos Gomez and Carlos López.

Fictional character biography

Early history 
Mary Jane is depicted as an extremely beautiful, green-eyed redhead and was the primary romantic interest of Peter Parker for the majority of the forty years between her first full appearance in 1966 and the One More Day story in 2007 (Peter and Mary Jane married in 1987). Initially, she competed with others for Peter's affection, most prominently with Gwen Stacy and the Black Cat. Mary Jane's relatively unknown early life was eventually explored in The Amazing Spider-Man #259.

Early issues of The Amazing Spider-Man featured a running joke about Peter dodging his Aunt May's attempts to set him up with "that nice Watson girl next-door", whom Peter had not yet met and assumed would not be his type, since his aunt liked her (in the Parallel Lives graphic novel an identical scenario is shown between Mary Jane and her Aunt Anna). Mary Jane made her first actual appearance in The Amazing Spider-Man #25 (June 1965), although her face was obscured. However, she was seen by both Liz Allan and Betty Brant, who are both shocked by how attractive she is. It is not until The Amazing Spider-Man #42 (November 1966) that her face is actually seen. In that issue, on the last page, Peter finally meets her, and he is stunned by her beauty even as she speaks the now-famous line: "Face it, Tiger... you just hit the jackpot!"

Peter begins to date her, much to the annoyance of Gwen Stacy. However, they eventually become irritated with each other and Peter subsequently chooses to date Gwen. Mary Jane, who becomes Harry Osborn's former love interest and former girlfriend for about a year, remains a close friend to Peter and Gwen.

Despite her enjoyment of life, her friendships, and dating, Mary Jane refuses to be tied down for too long. When her relationship with Harry Osborn comes to an end, it has significant impact on Harry, driving him to a drug overdose. This in turn creates a boomerang effect, driving his father Norman Osborn to the brink of insanity, temporarily restoring his memories as the Green Goblin.

After the Green Goblin murders Gwen in The Amazing Spider-Man #121, Mary Jane attempts to comfort Peter. Peter, who is distraught over the loss of Gwen Stacy, angrily confronts MJ about her seemingly flighty and carefree attitude. He questions her ability to ever care about people like him and Gwen, and states "You wouldn't be sorry if your own mother died," unaware that her mother had actually died. Mary Jane is hurt by Peter's comments. She attempts to leave, but hesitates as she approaches the door, and ultimately chooses to stay with him. This served as a turning point in their relationship, and over the next couple of years, she and Peter become very close friends. Eventually, upon realizing the feelings that they share for one another, they decide to take their relationship to the next level, having sex in the process. Their relationship has a few initial hurdles, such as MJ's hot temper and Peter's always dashing off to be Spider-Man. Following the events of the original clone saga, Peter realizes that Mary Jane is the girl he has always loved, and the two begin dating again.

Despite loving Peter, MJ does not wish to be tied down. Yet, she allows the relationship to progress and is left with a difficult decision when Peter proposes to her. After taking a short time to consider, she turns him down. Following a series of traumatic experiences involving Peter's absences and his costumed alter ego endangering his Aunt May, a spiritually exhausted MJ leaves New York for several months. Peter meanwhile dates other women, most notably Felicia Hardy.

MJ returns, her behavior showing a marked change with her abandonment of her false front. Following an attack on Peter by Puma, she breaks down and admits her knowledge of Peter's secret identity in The Amazing Spider-Man #257. After learning of her own family history in The Amazing Spider-Man #259, Peter finds a new respect for her and begins to truly understand her. MJ makes it clear to Peter that knowing his identity changes nothing about her feelings, and that she only loves him as a friend, her best friend.

Despite the one-shot graphic novel Amazing Spider-Man: Parallel Lives and Untold Tales of Spider-Man #16 revealing that Mary Jane discovered Peter's secret when she noticed Spider-Man climbing out of Peter's bedroom window after his uncle's murder, many comics published before this revelation claimed that she had simply "figured it out", with the details of how and when left ambiguous to the reader.

After yet another period of reconsidering his priorities in life, Peter contemplates letting go of the Spider-Man mantle, with Mary Jane backing the decision, but his relationship with Felicia Hardy soon resumes. Feeling lost and guilty, Peter visits Mary Jane and apologizes with an awkward kiss before heading to Berlin with Ned Leeds.

Following Ned Leeds' murder at the hands of the Foreigner, a changed and bitter Peter returns to New York, where his lack of direction in life is not helped when Ned is framed as the Hobgoblin, and Felicia elects to leave Peter behind as she is tied to the Foreigner. Mary Jane returns to Peter, presumably to patch things up, but Peter surprises her with a second proposal of marriage, which MJ again turns down. She returns to her family to settle old debts with her father, with Peter following her. After aiding her sister in having her crooked father arrested, and aiding Peter against a Spider-Slayer, Mary Jane has an epiphany on marriage, and agrees to become Peter's wife.

Marriage 
In spite of Peter and Mary Jane's mutual worry that they were marrying too early, Peter's concern for her safety, and her unwillingness to give up her "party girl" lifestyle, they marry. She adds Peter's surname to her own, making her Mary Jane Watson-Parker. They were, at that moment, really in love. Spider-Man wears his black costume around this time, but after Mary Jane is frightened by a stalking Venom, she convinces him to change back to his old costume.

Mary Jane continues to model after her marriage, but is stalked by her wealthy landlord, Jonathan Caesar. When she rejects his advances, he kidnaps her, but she manages to escape. While Caesar is briefly incarcerated, he uses his powerful business connections within the city and has her blacklisted as a model. She gets a role on the soap opera Secret Hospital, but is unhappy with her character's air-headed and mean personality. On top of that, Caesar, who has been released from prison and is still obsessed with Mary Jane, plots to kidnap her again—this time intending to whisk her away to a private island he owns in the Caribbean. After luring Mary Jane to an abandoned studio and threatening to kill her, Caesar is confronted by Officer Goldman, a policeman assigned to Mary Jane's original case against him. Goldman then shoots Caesar dead, saving Mary Jane's life. Although she successfully petitions her boss to adjust her character's personality, a deranged fan tries to kill Mary Jane out of hatred for the actions of her soap opera character. Mary Jane quits her job out of fear for her own safety and returns to modeling. This, along with Peter's role as Spider-Man, triggers a growing divide. She briefly flirts with actor Jason Jerome, who tries to tempt her into a secret affair. She resists out of faithfulness to Peter, but her weak rebuffs fail to convince Jerome, and she realizes she is enticed by him in spite of herself. However, she eventually realizes that her craving for romance can be filled by her husband as easily as an extramarital affair, and she pointedly rejects Jerome's advances while rebuking his behavior.

Due to this stress, and the seeming return of her husband's parents, Mary Jane begins smoking (a habit she had quit in high school), only increasing the tension between her and Peter. Peter ultimately convinces her to stop smoking when he tricks her into visiting Nick Katzenberg suffering heavily from lung cancer. When his parents are discovered to be fakes, Peter is unable to cope with the knowledge and disappears for a time. Mary Jane visits her sister Gayle and her father for the first time in years, and finally reconciles with them. Meanwhile, Peter overcomes his problems on his own. When she and Peter reunite, both are happier than they had been in a long time.

Pregnancy 
During the 1994–96 "Clone Saga" storyline, Peter's clone, Ben Reilly, appears. Mary Jane discovers that she is pregnant. While she experiences some complications in her pregnancy, Reilly's scientist friend Seward Trainer helps her. Peter and Ben are told by Trainer that Ben is the real Peter Parker, and Peter is the clone. After conducting the tests themselves (tests which Seward rigged) they confirm Seward's story. A disbelieving Peter, while arguing with Ben, strikes Mary Jane. After this, he decides to quit as Spider-Man, because the stress of his double life is endangering his wife and unborn child. Peter, acting on hypnotic suggestion by the Jackal, attempts to kill Mary Jane, but is prevented by Ben Reilly (as the Scarlet Spider), his teammates the New Warriors, and Kaine. Later, Peter and Mary Jane leave New York and move to Portland, Oregon. They live there peacefully for several months, adapting happily to normal life after an accident causes subtle damage to Peter's genetic structure that disrupts his ability to use his powers. However, they miss New York City and their friends, and move back, a strange illness culminating in the restoration of Peter's powers. During the Onslaught crisis, Mary Jane is scanned by a Sentinel robot, who detects genetic abnormalities in her fetus.

Soon afterward, when Mary Jane's baby is already past due, she is poisoned by Alison Mongrain, an agent of the Green Goblin. Mary Jane's baby is stillborn. Combined with Ben's death in a battle with the reborn Norman Osborn and the revelation that the tests identifying Peter as the clone were actually rigged as part of Osborn's plan to break Peter's spirit, Peter returns to the role of Spider-Man.

Marital problems 
Mary Jane returns to college to major in psychology, but the stress of the ongoing manipulations of Norman Osborn take their toll. After the Gathering of Five incident and the return of Aunt May, Mary Jane begs Peter to quit being Spider-Man.

He is happy to do so for several months, but soon feels the tug of his great power and great responsibility to be a hero. Meanwhile, Mary Jane is offered a new modeling contract and reaches new heights of success. Peter becomes Spider-Man again behind Mary Jane's back, which puts strain on their marriage. At the same time, she begins receiving lewd and threatening phone calls from an anonymous stalker. Mary Jane is flying across America when her airplane explodes in midair in Amazing Spider-Man Vol. 2 #13 (January 2000). Peter is shocked and goes into deep denial over her death. Although he is set up with several other women, and his friends encourage him to move on, he believes she is still alive. Her mysterious stalker, an unnamed, telepathic mutant, has telepathically connected to Peter in some way, and wants to take over his life. He kidnapped Mary Jane as part of his plan and held her hostage for several months. The stalker kills himself after finally gleaning enough of Peter's personality and morality to discover that he had done terrible things. Peter and Mary Jane are reunited in Peter Parker: Spider-Man #29 (June 2001).

The stress of her captivity drives Mary Jane away. She moves to Los Angeles and immerses herself in acting — starring as the doomed love interest in the film Lobster-Man. Although missing Peter after he fails to meet her on a visit back to New York, she refuses to talk to him; Aunt May gets Peter to visit her in Los Angeles, however the two remain separated. Peter's encounter with the supernatural Spider-Wasp Shathra eventually leads to the two of them flying to New York and Los Angeles to see each other. Despite missing each other at their respective homes, they meet in an airport in Denver, Colorado where they reconcile after a brief encounter with Doctor Doom and Latverian terrorists.

"Civil War" 
During the events of the 2006–2007 "Civil War" storyline, when Peter and Mary Jane's apartment and Aunt May's house are burned down by Charlie Weiderman, and Spider-Man joins the New Avengers, Mary Jane and Aunt May accompany him to live in Stark Tower. Mary Jane immediately feels at home with the New Avengers and is happy to finally be a part of Spider-Man's world.

The Civil War events forced Peter to stage a secret transfer of Mary Jane out of Stark Mansion, feeling that with the loss of his secret identity and his doubts about Tony Stark's ideas, Mary Jane had become a hostage in a luxurious house. Now residing in a cheap motel, her whole life had been affected, from her increasing difficulties in finding a new job as an actress to her being an easy target and prey, along with Aunt May, for the superpowered foes of Spider-Man.

Peter, Mary Jane, and Aunt May are targeted by an assassin working for Spider-Man's old foe, the Kingpin. When Peter returns to the Parker family's motel hideout, the assassin takes aim at Peter and fires, but hits Aunt May instead. Peter and MJ scramble to save Aunt May's life, rushing her from hospital to hospital while trying to maintain their fragile cover of anonymity. In trying to keep May alive and hidden from Spider-Man's enemies, they become fugitives on the run.

"One More Day" 
During the 2007 "One More Day" storyline, Peter is forced to decide whether he will accept Mephisto's offer to save Aunt May in return for wiping the knowledge and memory of Peter and MJ's life together as husband and wife from the face of reality, which would leave only a single, subconscious piece of their souls to remember their love and life together, allowing Mephisto to feast on the pain exhibited by those vestiges for eternity.

MJ, despite loving Peter, accepts Mephisto's offer, but only with the caveat that Mephisto promises to restore Spider-Man's secret identity. She also asks to put his life back as it was and have a chance at happiness. Mephisto accepts these terms, and in the revised timeline, which begins at the end of The Amazing Spider-Man #545, and is further explained in the following issues, MJ and Peter were never married but instead "dated seriously for years".

According to interviews conducted with then-Marvel editor-in-chief Joe Quesada, every story prior to this story remains canon (this would later be contradicted as the events of later stories imply MJ never fell pregnant). Quesada also stated that a gap of undefined duration occurred between pages in "One More Day", during which the couple separated. By the end of that period, MJ has moved to California to become an actress, but continues to visit New York from time to time. In the epilogue to "One More Day", she attends a "coming home" party held by ex-Harry Osborn during one such visit, with Peter catching a small glimpse of her before she left, after ignoring her.

New life 
At the end of The Amazing Spider-Man #560, as part of the "Brand New Day" storyline, Mary Jane makes her return as the girlfriend of actor Bobby Carr. In The Amazing Spider-Man #561, Mary Jane is seen getting into bed with Carr, and is later attacked by Paperdoll. Concealing herself in the panic room, Mary Jane observes a battle between Spider-Man and Paperdoll, and communicates with Spider-Man over the intercom. Mary Jane says that she and Spider-Man made a great team "in another life" and longingly touches a monitor screen showing his face, hinting that she still has strong feelings and misses him.

Peter does not learn that Mary Jane is the girlfriend of Carr nor that she was the voice on the intercom. Mary Jane is seen at the conclusion of the issue contemplating a phone call to Peter, but is hesitant to do so. She is asked for an autograph by Sara Ehret, an associate of Jackpot. Mary Jane tells her she does not know when she will return to New York. She left a message on Peter's machine but it was cut off before she could say anything.

Mary Jane has been living on the West Coast pursuing her acting career. She returns to New York after Carr is found to be taking Mutant Growth Hormone for a movie role, supplied by the White Rabbit. Carr complains that now she would tell them all about his drug use. His shallowness makes MJ walk away from him and take a TV job, which takes her back to New York City.

Mary Jane and Peter agree to meet with each other. Peter does not remember when or where as he had been drunk, and is further delayed due to his activities as Spider-Man. MJ also was drunk (while waiting for Peter to muster his courage to talk to her) and while she recalls their meeting she has overslept it. Issue 605 flashbacks to Mary Jane recalling a fight with Peter while he was dressed as Spider-Man, where she said that she did not care where he was and that he had a responsibility to their relationship. Peter begins to explain about his Uncle Ben, but Mary Jane interrupts him to say that he cannot let a single moment define his life.

In the 2010 "One Moment in Time" storyline, it is revealed that Mary Jane whispered to Mephisto that Peter would not agree to the deal unless Mary Jane tells him to make it, and that Mephisto will leave Peter alone forever when the deal is done. Mephisto replies "Agreed, as far as I'm concerned—this never happened." MJ did that to protect Peter. In present time MJ shows up at Peter's door. They talk about how they have been acting towards each other lately and both agree they want to be friends. They recall how Peter missed what was supposed to be their wedding day due to his activities as Spider-Man, leading MJ to demand that he retire from crimefighting. His refusal to do so convinced MJ that they must remain unmarried, since any children they might have would be endangered by his being a superhero.

Mary Jane goes to check on Anna Watson, just in time to stop a hitman, who goes after her. Spider-Man saves Mary Jane and dispatches the hitman. Spider-Man brings the wounded Mary Jane to Doctor Strange, who performs a healing spell on her. Peter insists that Doctor Strange should make people forget he is Spider-Man. Peter enters a protective shell to shield himself from the changes. At the last moment, he leaps out of the shield and pulls Mary Jane in with him so she will not forget either. Back in the present, Mary Jane explains that, although she still loves him, she is not strong enough to be at his side. She tells him he has to move on and find somebody who can be with him.

Peter soon begins a new relationship with Carlie Cooper. Though initially jealous, MJ decides to respect their relationship, and encourages Peter to reveal his secret identity only to her.

"Spider-Island" and "Ends of the Earth" 
During the "Spider-Island" storyline, much of New York City becomes infected with a virus that gives its inhabitants Peter's Spider-like abilities. MJ, who did not manifest any powers, finds herself caught in a series of riots across the city. Saved by the intervening Future Foundation, MJ later locates Peter and Carlie, the latter having also been granted spider-powers. MJ encourages Peter to use his civilian disguise when displaying his powers and rally the city against the chaos. She would later attain spider-powers herself and come to the aid of defenseless citizens, her prolonged contact with Peter during their relationship granting her a degree of immunity that protected her from Adriana Soria's mutative side-effects of the transformation. Peter successfully cures all of New York.

Shortly after, Carlie Cooper breaks up with Peter, having deduced his secret identity. Conflicted over her lingering feelings for Peter, Carlie confides in Mary Jane, and the two begin to bond over their experiences with Peter.

In the 2012 storyline "Ends of the Earth", Mary Jane purchases a nightclub.

"Dying Wish" and The Superior Spider-Man 
Mary Jane remains in the role of best friend and confidant to Peter until he begins to take an interest in her romantically again. They begin dating again. Unknown to MJ, Peter has had his mind swapped by Otto Octavius. The real Peter Parker, trapped in his rival's dying body, breaks out of prison and attempts to switch back, only for his body to eventually give out on him before he can complete the procedure. As a last resort, Peter downloads all of his memories and experiences into Octavius' mind, convincing his foe to develop some sense of responsibility. Octavius, as Peter, continues to date Mary Jane after this, but she begins noticing distinctly different character traits displayed by him, such as a heavy intake of alcohol and his rude behavior towards his loved ones. Octavius intends to become more intimate with her and makes several advances, only to be rebuffed each time. In desperation and frustration, Octavius relives Peter's memories with MJ, which infuriates Peter. After one of Octavius' Spider-Bots detect Mary Jane in trouble and saves her from the Vulture gang, Mary Jane moves to kiss him, but Octavius, who has by now developed genuine feelings for her, rebuffs her, and breaks up with her, though vowing to continue to protect her.

Peter's mind is returned to his body, and informs Mary Jane that it was Octavius' mind in control of Peter's body for the past several months. Mary Jane tells him that she knows Octavius' actions were not Peter's fault, but she cannot let his dual life affect her anymore. She recognizes and admires the choices Peter has made in his life, but now she wants to build her own life, mostly thanks to the successes she has enjoyed with her nightclub and her new relationship with Ollie.

All-New, All-Different Marvel 
As part of the All-New, All-Different Marvel event, Mary Jane Watson is in Chicago, Illinois hosting the opening of her newest nightclub Jackpot. Having ended her relationship with Ollie, Mary Jane had opened this nightclub after MJ's got destroyed during a superhero battle. When a Belhilio is quickly killed by an energy blast from Madame Masque, people start to run away as Iron Man and Doctor Doom arrive to confront her. With Mary Jane's assistance, Masque is apprehended, but during the fight the nightclub is irrevocably damaged. Three days later, Iron Man approaches Mary Jane Watson in Grant Park while she is mourning the loss of her club and offers her a job working for him. Mary Jane later waits for Tony Stark at Stark Tower, but their audition is interrupted by F.R.I.D.A.Y., who tells them that War Machine is missing. Before Tony becomes Iron Man and flies to Tokyo, Mary Jane gives Tony the emergency number for Peter Parker. It is revealed that Mary Jane declined Tony Stark's offer due to being uncomfortable around F.R.I.D.A.Y. However, Tony sends F.R.I.D.A.Y. to plead Mary Jane to help him stop the board of directors from seizing his company while he is off on a mission. Mary Jane claims to the board of directors that she is the new executive administrator, and she and F.R.I.D.A.Y. convince the board that the company is in safe hands.

In the Amazing Spider-Man series, it is revealed that she has eventually accepted Tony's employment offer when she and Tony attend a Parker Industry event, making Peter very uncomfortable. Later, she catches up with Betty Brant and Harry Osborn, and the three discover that businessman Augustus Roman is actually the powerful being known as Regent who is imprisoning heroes and villains to add to his own strength. Spider-Man and Iron Man try to stop Regent, but are defeated due to Regent's overwhelming power. With few options left, Mary Jane dons Peter's Iron Spider armor and uses her experience in Iron Man's suit and her brief spider powers in Spider-Island to assist Peter and Tony in battling Regent. During the fight, Mary Jane and Tony distract Regent long enough for Peter, Harry, and Miles Morales to release the rest of the prisoners. Mary Jane's attitude towards Peter during her time with him reminds Peter not to let his work take priority over his loved ones. Spider-Man warns Tony not to take Mary Jane for granted as Peter did not realize he lost Mary Jane until after she moved on.

After "Civil War II", Tony was put into a comatose state and his body went missing due to his own covert machinations. Mary Jane along with Riri Williams and Amanda Armstrong went on a search for him, and it was not until F.R.I.D.A.Y. made a calculated analysis that the A.I. duplicate of Tony would know exactly where to find him. However, Tony was continually complicating the search by sending them to other locations, believing he needed his privacy until he was finally ready.

After Peter's company went belly up, and he got a new career as the Daily Bugle's science editor, Mary Jane started being more supportive of Peter getting his life back on track. After a less than stellar Alchemax demonstration, Mary Jane and Peter started being more romantically involved, but as Peter still wore his Spider-Man suit, Mary Jane was conflicted: she wanted Peter to stop being Spider-Man but people really counted on him and she did not want to be the one to do that. She has Peter exit her apartment as Spider-Man so if anyone sees they will just think she was talking with him because she knows Stark.

After Norman Osborn becomes the Red Goblin, MJ received a warning from Peter and adjusted Stark Tower's defences against a Symbiote intruder. However, because Venom arrived before Red Goblin, the defenses only injured Venom and had no effect on the Red Goblin. Surviving with minor injuries after a short skirmish, MJ urged Peter to absorb the Venom Symbiote, which would give him the edge to stop his arch-enemy. She, along with others attacked by Red Goblin, were cured of his Carnage spikes by Flash Thompson with the Anti-Venom symbiote.

Fresh Start 
As part of the Fresh Start relaunch event, Peter's personal life took serious knocks in both his civilian and heroic life: his doctorate was determined to be based on plagiarized work (due to him having received the doctorate when Doctor Octopus was controlling his body and the scientist used his own work) which led to him being fired from the Bugle, while the Kingpin tried to separate Spider-Man from other heroes by making him the only vigilante he would accept in the new anti-vigilante New York. However, his personal life picked up when he began reconnecting with Mary Jane more regularly and they talked about recent events. Finally, Peter told Mary Jane that he needed her in his life once again, prompting Mary Jane to decide on a "fresh start" and resume her relationship with him one more time.

As she and Peter resume dating, Mary Jane is encouraged by a returning Carlie Cooper to join a special support unit for associates, friends and partners of superheroes run by Jarvis called The Look Ups. Hesitant at first, Mary Jane eventually shares with the group her feelings for Peter, the loss of her job at Stark Industries, and her anxieties and occasional doubts about her importance to him. Afterwards, Jarvis compliments Mary Jane and tells her she is indispensable. MJ lets Peter know this when they spend the night together shortly after Peter's battle with the Thieves Guild. Peter admits to Mary Jane that he revealed his secret identity once more to Felicia Hardy, but Mary Jane tells him that she is not envious of this and understands.

After Peter's return as a college student, Mary Jane joined him for a dinner visit with the Connors family, as Peter and Curt discussed Peter's being Curt's teacher assistant job offer. While Peter was reluctant to take the offer, Mary Jane tried to argue he take it, as the chance could help him going forward. While Peter is ill from fever, Mary Jane tries to care for him, but he goes running head long into danger as Taskmaster and Black Ant captured Curt Connors' son, Billy, and she worriedly awaits Peter as he departs. As she waits, she tries to alleviate her anxiety unaware that an unknown entity (Kindred) is stalking her to get to Peter; but Kindred does not hurt her, viewing her as an innocent. After waking up, she tripped on Peter's dropped clothing and broke a window, and as she was cleaning herself up Peter returned in his black suit (courtesy of Kraven) in a rushed panic believing some terrible had befallen her, but Mary Jane assured him that she was safe.

While attending a play with Carlie Cooper (Peter missing the planned date as he attempts to find the missing Curt Connors), Mary Jane gets unwittingly involved in an attack by the new Electro, who takes the lead actress hostage and attempts to ransom her online, only to change plans due to the low response to finding out how many people would pay to kill her. After Carlie causes a distraction, Mary Jane is able to switch places with the actress and trick Electro into a trap that knocks the villain out. The subsequent popularity of Mary Jane's speech prompts new public interest in her former acting career, to the point that her old agent calls her about new offers.

Mary Jane accepts one of these new offers, and with Peter's encouragement and support, heads off for a two-month stint in Hollywood filming a new movie. Peter had hoped to accompany Mary Jane to the airport, but he was forced to cancel those plans to help out his sister Teresa Parker. By the time Peter's mission had concluded, MJ had departed. The two would have a conversation by phone later that evening where Mary Jane assured Peter she understood why he could not take her to the airport and gives him all her love. It is revealed Peter had intended to propose to Mary Jane again had he been able to see her off.

Soon after filming started, Mary Jane discovered Mysterio's disguise as the movie's producer, who swore to her that this project was supposed to be an authentic depiction of his life. At first grudgingly, Mary Jane cooperated with him when the Savage Six began attacking the project after the Vulture felt offended for the "unauthorized" usage of his person in the plot. During an appearance on a talk show, Mary Jane witnessed a sinister, oni-masked individual committing a murder, and was placed under witness protection.

Mary Jane ultimately returned to New York amidst the chaos inflicted by Peter's allies the Order of the Web, who had been possessed by Kindred. Mary Jane is caught in a head-on collision but survives and is rescued by Norman Osborn. Norman takes her back to Ravencroft where he reveals to her that he is now a changed man, cleansed of his sins, and that Kindred is his son Harry Osborn. Mary Jane agrees to help Norman reach Harry and is brought to Kindred's lair, where she finds Peter and the Order of the Web are now captives. Harry tortures Peter, demanding that he confess to something, but MJ tells Harry Peter has no recollection of the precise sin. She tells Harry she blames herself for his downward spiral and offers to sacrifice herself. Norman suddenly attacks and seemingly cuts down Mary Jane with a pumpkin bomb, which enrages Harry. A panicked Peter checks on Mary Jane, but she assures him the bomb is a blank and that this all part of the plan. Kindred is ultimately captured by the alliance of Norman and Wilson Fisk.

Mary Jane decides to remain in New York and help Peter deal with the fall out of Kindred's attack. She takes him to the old theatre where she got her big break and encourages him to use performance art to vent out his frustrations. Peter does so and he eventually breaks down, MJ comforts him. After Peter heads off to attend class at ESU, Mary Jane discovers Mysterio was eavesdropping. Mysterio asks Mary Jane if she will ever tell her boyfriend about their working arrangement, MJ tells him Peter has enough on his mind, and asks Mysterio about Kindred, suspecting he knows the truth, but Mysterio does not commit to an answer 

Peter and Mary Jane eventually attend the premiere of MJ's new movie, and Peter is formerly introduced to Cage McKnight, still in the dark over his true identity. MJ tells Mysterio she will tell Peter the truth later tonight. Peter has a surprise of his own as he is planning to propose to Mary Jane when the movie is over, but the Savage Six take the opportunity to attack, eager for a taste of revenge on Mysterio. As the crowds in the movie theatre disperse, Mary Jane stops to help people who have fallen over, and stands her ground against the Tarantula. Peter switches to Spider-Man and comes to her rescue. Doctor Octopus and the four of his team then attack the theatre. Mysterio assists Mary Jane, exposing his identity to Peter and the Sinister and Savage teams. Mary Jane confesses to a concerned Peter that she knew who Mysterio was all along and vouches for him. Mysterio tries to tell Peter that he and Mary Jane's deal with Mephisto is to blame for everything that is presently happening, but Peter is far too distracted by the warring factions.

Otto offers Beck the opportunity to join the Sinister Six, as long as he helps them capture Mary Jane. Mysterio escapes, taking MJ with him, promising her that the 'devil will get his due'

Beck takes Mary Jane to his old studios, he reveals to her of his prior demise and descent into hell, but that he was offered a chance at renewed life by Harry Osborn. Beck did as instructed and 'did his bidding', in exchange, Kindred opened up new worlds for Beck to explore such as the Ultimate Universe. Over time, the visits from Kindred became less frequent and Beck let his guard down, believing himself to be free, until Kindred had use for him again. Beck then reveals to Mary Jane that he was instrumental in helping her come to terms with Harry's 'death' in his guise of Doctor Ludwig Rinehart, although Mary Jane can barely recall this. Despite Mary Jane's pleas, Mysterio remains loyal to Kindred's plan and leaves her to his master's mercy

Kindred unmasks to reveal the features of what appears to be Gwen Stacy, but is in actuality the husk of Sarah Stacy, the alleged daughter of Gwen and Norman Osborn. Mary Jane learns Kindred is still Harry using Sarah's body as a host, and that she nor her brother Gabriel was never truly Norman or Gwen's child, but clones created by an A.I version of Harry. Mary Jane also discovers that Mysterio tampered with her memories disguised as her therapist, which led her to believe the cloned twins were Gwen's children. Kindred tells Mary Jane the time has come to face her own sins and opens a doorway to Hell.

Mary Jane flees into one of Kindred's portals and arrives at Sarah and Gabriel's home in Paris, where she tends to a stricken Peter. She and Peter briefly banter until Norman arrives to warn them that Sarah and Gabriel are preparing to ambush them. As Peter holds his own against the twin Kindred, Norman admits to Mary Jane that he made a deal with Mephisto, to which MJ reacts with shock. Norman's son Harry, now revealed to have been a clone of the original, arrives to help tip the scales in Peter's conflict with Kindred, but is eventually, and brutally, cut down and killed. Peter is also eventually buried under rubble. Mary Jane comes to his rescue. Their unwavering commitment to one another rids the Kindred spirits of Mephisto's influence, and the Stacy twins are finally allowed to die.

In Las Vegas, Doctor Strange is involved in a high stakes gambit with Mephisto to free the true Harry Osborn's soul from the grasp of the devil, Upon succeeding, Strange asks Mephisto why he has attempted to claim Peter Parker. Mephisto reveals he foresees a future where Peter will defeat him and end his reign over the Earth. As Doctor Strange departs, he reminds Mephisto that the love Peter shares with those closest to him will always enhance his life and make every one of them better. The vision of Mephisto's future changes to show it is a red-headed Spider-Woman, not Peter, who ultimately thwarts the devil's reign.

Mary Jane and Peter make their way home to heal and face the dawn of a new day together as a loving, and seemingly 'unbreakable', couple.

Spider-Man Beyond
In the wake of Harry's death, Mary Jane advises a grieving Peter to perhaps devote some time to properly process the loss and take a break from being Spider-Man. Before Peter can consider these plans though, he is caught up in a battle with the perilous U-Foes that incapacitates him, leading to his hospitalisation. His clone, Ben Reilly, contacts Mary Jane and May Parker. Mary Jane is angry with Ben, believing him to be responsible for Peter's predicament. Peter then slips into a coma, but not before giving Ben his blessing to take the reins as Spider-Man in his absence.

Peter eventually recovers and awakens from his coma, Mary Jane continues to look after him, and at one point saves him from a serial killer stalking the wards of the hospital

Peter's condition eventually draws out Felicia Hardy, and she and Mary Jane unite to save Peter from the clutches of criminal The Hood, who is need of his cloak. They locate it at the headquarters of Tombstone. Mary Jane disguises herself as the Black Cat and retrieves the cloak, the two then return it to The Hood, where it ends up devouring him. Peter, asleep the entire time, awakes to find Mary Jane and Felicia present, but believes it to be a recurring dream he has of the two women and asks them to be 'gentle' with him. Mary Jane and Felicia later joke about their mutual interest in Peter on the rooftops, with Felicia admitting how 'perfect' MJ is for Peter.

Mary Jane returns home, where she is confronted by Ben Reilly's girlfriend Janine Godbe, aka Elizabeth Tyne, who is in possession of a hard drive provided by Otto Octavius that details the hidden agenda of the Beyond corporation, which presently employs Ben. Mary Jane takes Janine to the Daily Bugle, but they are confronted by the Queen Goblin, aka Doctor Ashley Kafka, Ben's psychiatrist, infected with all of the sin of Norman Osborn. Ben Reilly makes the save, but due to the Beyond corporation tampering with his mind to make him more controllable, Ben has forgotten how to be selfless and responsible, so he decides to save what is most important to him only and flees with Janine, leaving Mary Jane to the mercy of Kafka. Before Kafka can use her 'goblin gaze' on Mary Jane to draw out her anxieties and innermost fears, they are interrupted by Felicia. Kafka instead uses her gaze on Felicia and its effects compel Felicia to suicide. However, Felicia is saved by Peter. Mary Jane hands over Peter's costume to him and he suits up to confront Kakfa. After Peter defeats the Queen Goblin, Mary Jane tells him to go and find his 'brother' Ben

Shortly afterwards, Peter fails to save Ben from the manipulations of the Beyond corporation, denying Ben a chance to reclaim his missing memories leads to Peter being soundly beaten by his former ally. Mary Jane helps Peter grieve the loss of Ben as well as aid in his physical recovery. Weeks pass, and after completing a session at her apartment, Mary Jane asks Peter if he'd like to stay with her, not just for today, but for good, believing the time has come once more to share their lives together. Peter readily accepts, only for the two to be interrupted by a mysterious being bathed in light. The being tells Peter a path of blood has led him to his door and that Peter must come with him.

Six Months Later/Hellfire Gala
Following an incident that decimates a section of Pennsylvania, Peter finds himself alienated from the superhero community and on bad terms with Mary Jane. The two have broken up and Mary Jane is now seemingly dating a man named Paul, with kids seeing Mary Jane as a mother figure, with the daughter heavily resembling her. Despite their lack of communication, Mary Jane still shows concern for Peter when Felicia Hardy pays her a visit asking about his present whereabouts. 

Sometime later, Mary Jane and her Aunt Anna have become brand ambassadors for medical treatments supplied by the mutant island nation of Krakoa, with an ailing Anna now suffering from dementia. Mary Jane arranges a meeting with Norman Osborn to verify that the treatments are safe to use. At Oscorp, she meets up with Peter, who apologizes for routinely trying to call her when she did not want to be contacted. Mary Jane accepts his apology and attempts to tell him something truthful about how she is presently feeling when the two are interrupted by Paul. It is implied Paul has had a visceral encounter with Peter in the past. Mary Jane and Paul depart, with MJ telling Paul she has the assurances she needs to try out the medicines, and makes preparations to attend the annual Hellfire Gala. 

MJ later finds an intruder in her Aunt's house, the X-Men's former ally-turned-nemesis Moira MacTaggart, who attacks her and renders her unconscious, intending to take her place at the Gala by disguising herself as her. 

Using Mary Jane as a "eat puppet", Moira infiltrates the Gala and interacts with several in attendance, including her son Proteus and MJ's ex boyfriend Peter. Eventually, the X-Men uncover the truth behind Moira's infiltration, and Mary Jane temporarily breaks free of Moira's control to try and warn Logan of her predicament. Eventually, Moira escapes Krakoa along with a clone of Mr. Sinister, only for Peter and Wolverine to follow them. Later, Moria is seen meeting with Druig of the Eternals revealing the secrets of the Five's resurrection protocols. Moira has abandoned Mary Jane, with the implication that she has killed the Krakoan ambassador.

However, this is not the case, and Peter and Logan are able to successfully rescue Mary Jane. Upon returning to New York, Peter offers to talk to Mary Jane, but she refuses. Peter asks if it's because of Paul. When she confirms this is so, Peter challenges MJ on her feelings for Paul, but MJ angrily says this isn't about him, but about something she thought he understood responsibility, and walks away.

Dark Web
As Peter's friends assembled at the Coffee Bean to honour the memory of the twice dead Harry Osborn, Mary Jane decided now was the appropriate time to make peace with Peter and asked if she could share a coffee with him.

Shortly after the party, Mary Jane returned home, where she and her family came under attack from demons possessing the furniture. Felicia Hardy arrived on the scene with the intent on checking in on MJ's well being, only to find MJ defending her family with newly acquired powers. The exact nature of MJ's abilities are determined by pure chance and she has no control over which ones will manifest. When a curious Felicia teased Mary Jane about her powers, she refused to reveal where the powers came from and that Peter, who is unaware of them, must never know. Mary Jane asks Felicia to watch out for Peter, before both are transported to Limbo where they run into Count Belsaco. Belasco reveals to Black Cat that he summoned her there for a reason and considers MJ "a charming bonus". Over dinner he explains to them that he once had a Soul Sword that he made with the help of the  Elder Gods, and used to rule over Limbo until the Gods confiscated it from him as a punishment and  Magik overthrew him with her own Soul Sword. The Elder Gods put the sword in the Screaming Castle, a place he could never get to until Chasm and  Madelyne Pryor's demonic invasion of New York created an opportunity for him. He wanted the two of them to steal back the sword for him so he could re-conquer Limbo and agreed to send them back to Earth once they'd done so. Upon entering the castle the two are attacked by the castles cannibalistic prisoners, with Mary Jane reluctantly using her powers after explaining to Black Cat that her powers work by creating a roulette wheel and she isn't sure what will happen if she gets three skulls. The cannibals chase them to a bottomless pit but they are saved by S'ym.

Powers and abilities 
Mary Jane has no superpowers. She is a talented model, actress, and businesswoman.

Cultural impact and legacy

Critical reception 
Mike Avila of Syfy called Mary Jane "incredibly popular," saying, "The redheaded girl-next-door — who was teased, but not seen, throughout Spider-Man's early years — made the greatest entrance in comic book history in the last page of Amazing Spider-Man #42. The John Romita Sr.-drawn panelintroduced a vivacious redhead (based on Ann Margaret, incidentally) who would eventually become not just the most important person in Peter Parker's world, but a comics superstar on her own. No other powerless Marvel character holds a candle to MJ. Not Nick Fury, not Jarvis, not Sharon Carter, not even Aunt May." Cole Kennedy of CBR.com wrote, "In a panel that would be recreated in Spider-Man comics for decades to come, Mary Jane makes her first full appearance with the famous line: "Face it, tiger, you just hit the jackpot." From that moment on, Mary Jane was entangled in the crazy web of Spider-Man's life. She's become one of the most popular and recognizable characters in Marvel Comics, starring in several of her own comic book series. If fans look to Marvel's multiverse, they'll find many fascinating versions of MJ, including some who've developed superpowers themselves." Darby Hart of Screen Rant asserted, "Mary Jane Watson has been one of the most significant characters in the world of Spider-Man since her debut and has grown far beyond the standard girlfriend or damsel in distress stock figure that was common in comics at the time of her inception in the 1960s. Her greatest comic book stories have shown her to be one of the most independent and courageous characters in the Marvel Universe."

Accolades 
 In 2014, Comicbook.com ranked Mary Jane 2nd in their "7 Best Female Characters from the Spider-Man Multiverse" list.
 In 2019, CBR.com ranked Mary Jane 10th in their "Spider-Man: His 10 Best Sidekicks" list.
 In 2022, The A.V. Club ranked Mary Jane 36th in their "100 best Marvel characters" list.
 In 2022, CBR.com ranked Mary Jane 3rd in their "Most Wholesome Spider-Man Characters" list and ranked her and Peter Parker 3rd in their "10 Best Marvel Couples" list.

Impact 
 American actor and musician Childish Gambino references Mary Jane and Aunt May in his song "Shadows" from his second studio album Because the Internet.
 In Just Jack's 2007 single "Writer's Block", Mary Jane is mentioned with the verse "I'm lovin' Mary Jane, flyin' with Lois Lane".
 Scarlet Pleasure, a Danish R&B band, features the Spider-Man and Mary Jane couple with the line "There's no Peter Parker without Mary Jane" in their 2018 song "Superpower".
 "I'm Peter Parker and I love Mary Jane, she's always in my brain, if I told her, would she feel the same?" is the chorus for "I'm Peter Parker and I Love Mary Jane", a song by party punk band Porno Arcade from their 2018 album Gypso.
 American singer-songwriter Weird Al Yankovic's "Ode to a Superhero" is a song dedicated to Spider-Man, with the lyrics mentioning Harry Osborn and Peter Parker's crush, Mary Jane Watson.
 "All Things Go" by Chiddy Bang has the lyrics "And we be Peter Parker in love with the Mary Jane".
 Smash Mouth's "She Turns Me On" has the lyrics "Lois Lane, Mary Jane, we may never get home".
 Indie pop singer Noelle Bean contains the lyrics "Like Superman and Lois Lane, you're Peter Parker and I'm your Mary Jane" in her song "Lois Lane".
 Filk and rap artist Luke Ski has a song titled "Peter Parker" with the lyrics "Loves his Aunt May, Mary Jane, yeah he'd like, to meet her, Get the girl, save the world, and his name is Peter".
 Indie rock band Professor Caffeine & the Insecurities has a song titled "You're My Mary Jane, Not My Gwen Stacy" in their 2015 EP Comic Book.
 Rock band Onara has a song titled "Mary Jane" with the lyrics "You know I'm your Peter Parker and I'll never be no Bruce Wayne, and I don't want no Wonder Woman, I only want my Mary Jane".
 British hip-hop artist MF Doom references Spider-Man and Mary Jane in his single "Kon Queso" with the verse "In love with Mary Jane, she's my main thing, pulled her right from that web head, what a lame brain".
 Are You Johnson?, a 2015 album by musical artist Don Strange, includes a song titled "Spider-Man and Mary Jane".
 American rapper Logic alludes to both Mary Jane and marijuana with the lyrics "Pass the Mary Jane like I'm runnin' a train with Peter Parker" of his 2018 song "Warm It Up".
 Rich Homie Quan makes a cheeky allusion to Mary Jane as well in his song "Still Going In".
 Shibuya Sunrise's song "Jackpot (Face it Tiger)" is about Peter Parker and Mary Jane's love story, with the chorus having the "Face it, Tiger, we hit the jackpot" lyric as a reference to Mary Jane's first words to Peter.
 The O.C. has an episode where Seth Cohen wears a Spider-Man costume and kisses Summer Roberts upside-down, a homage to the famous upside-down kiss in the rain between Peter and Mary Jane in the 2002 Spider-Man film.
 Sheldon Cooper from The Big Bang Theory quotes Peter's declaration of love to Mary Jane from the 2002 film on a date with Amy.
 The television show Heroes has its character, Hiro Nakamura, refer Charlie as his "one true love, like Spider-Man's Mary Jane".
 In The Simpsons episode "Married to the Blob", a featured song called "Comic Book Guy's Lament" includes the line "I've always been happy, to call myself single, no Mary Jane, or Lois Lane, with whom I co-mingle, you could say that I was, an unstackable pringles, I've got original, sign by Siegel and Shuster, but they don't satisfy, in the way that they use to".
 Marge Simpson and Homer Simpson from The Simpsons recreated the Spider-Man upside down kiss as well.
 The 2004 film Shrek 2 features heavy pop culture references, including a scene where Fiona kisses Shrek, who is hanging upside down—which was meant as a homage to the Spider-Man kiss.
 Chrissy Teigen and John Legend re-enacted the upside down kiss, with Teigen as Spider-Man, in the show Lip Sync Battle.
 Popular comedy web television series One Day at a Time has one of its characters reference Mary Jane as "Peter Parker's girlfriend."

Literary reception

Amazing Mary Jane - 2019 
According to Diamond Comic Distributors, Amazing Mary Jane #1 was the 6th best selling comic book in October 2019.

Mike Fugue of CBR.com ranked Amazing Mary Jane #1 2nd in their "Comics You Need To Read This Week" list, stating, "The Amazing Mary Jane #1 is a smart, topical, and often hilarious debut starring everyone’s favorite redhead, in her very first solo series. Leah Williams’ script shines and balances lighthearted quips with serious social commentary masterfully. Carlos Gomez’s artwork is gorgeous and while he doesn’t get an opportunity to illustrate larger-than-life battles, there is an urgency to his visual pacing and still manages to pull off show-stopping panels. This book is a lot of fun and manages to be so without feeling too twee."

Mary Jane & Black Cat: Beyond  - 2022 
According to Diamond Comic Distributors, Mary Jane & Black Cat: Beyond #1 was the 21st best selling comic book in January 2022.

Sayantan Gayen of CBR.com referred to Mary Jane & Black Cat: Beyond #1 as a "thrilling tale peppered with drama and intrigue," writing, "It is not an exaggeration to say that Mary Jane & Black Cat: Beyond #1 features one of the best Marvel crossovers in recent history. Jed MacKay writes an equally beautiful team-up of Black Cat and Ben Reilly in the Death of Doctor Strange: Spider-Man #1. Needless to say, MacKay has a good grasp on the character of Felicia Hardy and has found a seamless way to connect her with other characters across the Spider-Man mythos. Mary Jane and Black Cat may look at each other as romantic rivals, but the instant bonding between the two and the comfort they feel in each other's company is heartwarmingly beautiful to see. Mary Jane & Black Cat: Beyond #1 is an enthralling and charming tale." Hannibal Tabu of Bleeding Cool gave Mary Jane & Black Cat: Beyond #1 a grade of 8 out of 10, saying, "Jed MacKay has done some great work in building the legend of the Black Cat over the last few years, and this issue carries through the fruits of those labors in a Felicia Hardy that's quick to improvise but just as considerate and calculating."

Other versions

The Amazing Spider-Man: The Daily Comic Strip
As a major character in the comic strip version of The Amazing Spider-Man, Mary Jane was a prominent character, flirting with Peter and serving as a persistent love interest. Mary Jane spent many years of the strip employed at a computer store. Peter would propose to Mary Jane several times in the strip only for her to reject these advances. Unlike her 616 variant, Mary Jane did not have existing knowledge of Peter's duel identity, only finding out when Peter finally confessed during the 1986 run of comic strips. Peter would propose to Mary Jane once again but she feared accepting would mean they would have children that could be afflicted with side-effects from Peter's radioactive blood, and rejected the proposal. Mary Jane briefly departed New York but eventually returned, fully prepared to leave Peter behind once and for all after becoming envious of the attention he was receiving from another woman. Peter assured Mary Jane his heart was always set on her and proposed one more time, this time Mary Jane accepted and they quickly eloped. 

Mary Jane's stance on not having children with Peter ultimately also mellowed, and she would discuss the possibility of parenthood several times with her husband in the ensuing years. She would also begin to encourage Peter to spend more time vacationing with her. 

In time, Mary Jane grew tired of her job selling computers and seized several opportunities to become an actress, spending time by herself in Los Angeles, with Peter eventually coming over to visit and spend the Christmas holidays with her. 

In years past, Mary Jane's character constantly needed saving by Spider-Man. This resulted in a complaint by a reader that saw the strip dropped by the Toronto Star in the late '70s and early '80s. Mary Jane being in constant danger is often because she has risked her life to save Peter by joining in his battles, facing off against Doctor Doom, Morbius, Sabretooth. and Doctor Octopus. Peter and MJ remain happily married despite all of these obstacles. MJ has also covered for Peter by taking photographs of his battles. After taking a photo of Sabretooth, Peter suggested they share the credit for the photo, but MJ refused, insisting she was "just an actress".

Recently, Mary Jane's successful stint with her Broadway play, Picture Perfect, has given her and Peter financial stability, though Peter occasionally displays personal jealousy of MJ making more money, a fact MJ has teased him about whenever he contemplates quitting his regular job as a photographer, forcing him to reconsider to soothe his competitive ego. Despite these hang-ups, Peter continues to supports his wife's job and ambitions unconditionally. The Parkers at one point discussed moving into a new house using the revenue she was earning from the play, but nothing so far has come of those plans. Mary Jane's play was eventually forced to temporarily close due to the theatre needing much-needed maintenance. Producers of an old direct-to-video movie MJ starred in called Marvella eventually contacted her and offered her a contract to reprise her role, with a three-month filming schedule in New York. The filming brought her and Peter into conflict with Peter's old foe Mysterio.

During the Spider-Verse event, the pair were visited by Morlun. Despite Morlun being a match for Peter's strength, MJ valiantly stands up to the intruder and encourages her husband. Due to the temporal instability affecting this reality, Morlun quickly realizes it will take weeks to accomplish a simple feat. The Master Weaver of the Inheritors then pulls him out of the reality, and privately elects to rebel against his masters, preserving this universe within a pocket dimension and safeguard it from any further Inheritor attacks. This action also prevents this universe from being affected by the reality-shattering events of Secret Wars, and thus it does not form a part of the patchwork planet Battleworld.

During production of Marvella II, a brainwashed Harry Osborn, in the guise of The Hobgoblin, attacked her and Peter. The Black Widow, Natasha Romanov offered to serve as MJ's bodyguard for the duration of filming, but Mary Jane grew envious of the Black Widow spending time investigating Harry with her husband. Eventually Harry was stopped and Natasha made it clear to Mary Jane she had no interest in Peter romantically.

Following adventures in which she was pursued romantically by Sub-Mariner and Xanadu, Mary Jane learned that Marvella II had been given a theatrical release, and that she was to commence a publicity tour across the nation. She and Peter journeyed to Los Angeles by car, stopping in New Mexico along the way to team with Rocket Raccoon against the likes of Ronan the Accuser and a Kree sentry.

Peter and MJ briefly part ways when Peter decides to attend his Aunt's wedding to the Mole Man, while MJ moves forward with the tour. After an adventure with Mole Man (who calls off the wedding to rule over his people once more), Peter reunites with MJ in Florida where they help Bruce Banner battle The Lizard. MJ resumes her tour while Peter returns to New York. During a battle with The Kingpin, Mary Jane's theatre is destroyed by a helicopter crash. MJ catches wind of this on the news, but is not angry with Peter. She returns home and tells Peter Marvella II was not received well critically and is projected to bomb. She suggests she and Peter spend time in Australia until her play can be moved to a new theatre venue. When Peter was taken over by The Purple Man, Mary Jane teamed up with Luke Cage to free him. Afterwards, Peter and MJ headed off to Australia, at which point the newspaper strip concluded.

What If? 
 A widowed Mary Jane appears in What If? Kraven killed Spider-Man.
 In What If? House of M, where Scarlet Witch removed the powers of all superheroes, Mary Jane is happily married to Peter and the two conceive their daughter May, who would later become a mother herself.
 In What If? The Fantastic Four were killed by De'Lila the New Fantastic Four composed of Spider-Man, Hulk, Wolverine and Ghost Rider have stayed together and moved to Four Freedoms, where Peter's wife, Mary Jane became its homemaker.
 In What If? Avengers lost the Operation Galactic Storm, Mary Jane was one of the many countless people killed by the Kree Empire.

The Amazing Spider-Man: Renew Your Vows 

Following on from the events of Secret Wars, where deadly incursions have laid waste to most of the multiverse, Battleworld, a planet composed of the remains of alternate realities, is created by Doctor Doom and Doctor Strange, with each reality on the world divided into different domains. In this domain called the Regency, Mary Jane is married to Peter and they have a daughter named Annie May Parker. Spider-Man is seemingly the only hero left in the domain after the powerful Regent (Augustus Roman) kills the Avengers and establishes himself as ruler of the domain, with Peter opting to retire as Spider-Man to raise Annie and live up to his vows as a father. Peter did not fight Regent initially to protect his family from Venom and ends up killing Eddie Brock in the process at Mary Jane's request.

Eight years later, Mary Jane is still struggling as an actress, while her husband is forced to make money off of photos he cannot publish for fear of making The Regent's forces look bad. Mary Jane takes Annie to school and instructs her not to reveal her powers in public even if the situation calls for it. However, they are forced to confront Regent eventually and stand their ground with some of the remaining heroes. After Annie gains a costume and assists her father in combat, Mary Jane obtains armor that acts similarly to Regent's tech which drained the powers of heroes to make him stronger to assist her family. She and Peter defeat the tyrant and resume their peaceful family life with Annie.

In the follow-up series, Mary-Jane uses a modified version of the armor she used in the fight against Regent, which now replicates Spider-Man's powers and allows her to assist her family as Spinneret. However, every time she taps into Peter's powers, it weakens him significantly. She now operates her own clothing store in addition to being a mother and superhero.

In an attempt to spare Peter from this, Mary Jane learns of a bio-enhanced suit in the possession of old family friend Liz Allan, and acquires it from her. However, the suit is revealed to be the Venom symbiote, which briefly attempts to take control of Mary Jane and use her against Peter, attempting to gain revenge for Peter killing Eddie Brock. Peter uses the Regent tech to weaken the symbiote, allowing Mary Jane to retaliate and bring the symbiote under her control. The symbiote is eventually destroyed in their final battle with the Green Goblin and she continues raising Annie into her teenage years, designing a new costume for her older daughter in the process. Mary Jane takes the moniker Spinneret and Annie goes by Spiderling.

It is implied that the 616 Peter, Mary Jane, and Regent retain memories of their counterparts from this Battleworld.

The Parker family of this world finally meet the Peter Parker of Earth 616 in the 2018 event Spider-Geddon. Peter suggests they look after the now infant and helpless Inheritors, but the Parkers stress to him that taking care of one kid is enough. The adventure also reveals their daughter Annie is part of the Spider-Scroll prophecy, the "Pattern Maker".

Earth X 
In this reality, Mary Jane ended up getting a severe disease instead of superhuman abilities when the Terrigen Mists unlocked the Celestial Seed inside of Humanity. She died shortly afterward, but later reappeared as an illusion cast by the Spiders-Man to Peter. She also took care of a younger version of May, who would be bonded with the a symbiote in a few years time.

Exiles 
In Exiles, Mary Jane is Spider-Woman, a member of the Avengers. Mary Jane is a lesbian who fell in love with the reality-hopping Mariko Yashida, the ill-fated Exiles member Sunfire. The two enjoy a romantic relationship, albeit one interrupted by Sunfire's dimensional jumping responsibilities. The main threat these Avengers face is Phalanx-versions of most of their friends and millions of innocent humans. Sunfire manages to return to Mary-Jane for some time, although none of their friends know how long this will be. They resolve to enjoy whatever time they have left, which ends when dimensional energies snatch Sunfire away again during an almost shared bath.

House of M 
The 2005 House of M crossover series version of Mary Jane is a world-famous actress, and she is one of the few humans that the mutant population likes. She has co-starred in movies with Spider-Man, who has led the mutant population to believe that he is a mutant, when in fact he is not. In her latest movie, she plays Spider-Man's real-life wife, Gwen Stacy. Mary Jane is also in a relationship with Tony Stark and also there were rumours circulating in the newspaper that they are married secretly.

Mangaverse 
In the Marvel Mangaverse, Mary Jane Watson is Spider-Woman, a new initiate into the Spider-clan (of ninjas), with her boyfriend (Peter Parker) showing her the ropes. In the 2005-'06 New Mangaverse five part limited series, they join several other heroes in combating a superhero massacre. They are also among the last surviving heroes at the end of the series.

Marvel 1602 
Marvel 1602, an eight-issue limited series set in the Elizabethan era, was published in 2003. Its popularity led to the publication of two sequels: 1602: New World and Spider-Man: 1602. The character of Marion Jane Watsonne is introduced in Spider-Man: 1602 #3. The Watsonne family are a theatrical troupe, originally from the same village in Scotland as Peter Parquagh. Marion, an actress, must pose as a boy in England, because women are not allowed on the stage. In France, where Peter sees her, she is under no such restrictions. Marion encounters Peter when he saves the life of her brother, Graeme. After a brief stint as the troupe's acrobat, Peter is kidnapped by Baron Octavius (this reality's version of Doctor Octopus). When he escapes, he discovers the troupe has been hired by Octavius and moved to Vienna. With her family locked in the dungeon and herself being used as bait to lure Peter into a trap, Marion and Peter are reunited. After a violent battle with several 1602 versions of the Green Goblin, the Lizard, and Bullseye, the two find happiness with each other and presumably wed, but Peter is eventually killed by Morlun. On a final note, a preserved sample of Peter's blood is found 400 years later and becomes the basis for the Super-Soldier formula that would create Captain America.

Marvel Zombies and Marvel Zombies Return 
In Marvel Zombies, an infected Peter Parker arrives home to save Mary Jane and Aunt May but he loses control and eats them instead. After he has eaten, Peter is consumed by the guilt and grief of what he has done to the last two people who ever loved him, refusing to take off his mask so he will not have to look himself in the eyes again. This guilt is a major plot point. Marvel Zombies Return: Spider-Man reveals that MJ was zombified after Peter ate her. She reappears in an alternative reality and is later seen being eaten by a zombified Sinister Six that the original zombie Spider-Man accidentally created when he succumbed to his hunger while trying to stop his enemies.

MC2 Universe 

In the MC2 universe, which depicts an alternative future timeline for the Marvel Universe, Mary Jane remains married to Peter Parker. Peter's original clone Kaine reunited Mary Jane with her baby daughter in this continuity. Kaine had found the child living with agents of Norman Osborn. Mary Jane's daughter became Spider-Girl, alias May "Mayday" Parker. Many years later, after a complicated pregnancy, Mary Jane would give birth to a baby son, Benjamin. She is a respected fashion designer and businesswoman, secretly opening a store selling Spider-Girl related merchandise to pay for May's and Ben's educations. She has recently become a guidance counselor at May's school, where she learns of the anti-mutant group Humanity First. She also becomes a mother figure to April Parker, the unstable symbiotic clone of Mayday for a time.

While caring for Baby May, Alison Mongraine became quite attached to the girl. Because of this, she returns years later to make contact with May. May and Mary Jane forgive Alison, who sincerely regrets her crime and loves the girl like her own child.

During the Spider-Verse event, the Parkers come under attack from Daeomos, brother to Morlun, and a member of a powerful dimension-hopping family of parasites called Inheritors, who, like Morlun, feed on the animal totems of the living. As Daemos brings the Parker home crashing down around them, Mary Jane hands over Baby Benjamin to her daughter and instructs her to keep him safe, while she elects to stay behind and assist her husband in delaying the Inheritor. Mary Jane is heard to scream off-panel as Mayday evacuates the house with her brother. Peter is shown to have perished at Daemos' hand. Mayday is saved by other Spider-Men from alternate realitys who have been trying to rescue as many Spiders as possible from the Inheritors, and she vows to kill Daemos and avenge her fallen family. It is later revealed Benjy is the "scion" sought after by the Inheritors who will play a major part in a prophecy that will lead to their defeat. Ultimately, Baby Benjy is rescued and Mayday instead shows mercy to the Inheritors when she is presented with an opportunity to slay that family's own father, Solus.

When Mayday returns to her home dimension, she discovers Mary Jane and her boyfriend Wes are alive, MJ having managed to pull Wes out of the house before it collapsed. MJ confirms to Mayday that her husband is dead but that he would be glad to know his family are safe and sound. MJ suggests Mayday wear her father's costume in his honor. Mayday decides to retire from being Spider-Girl and temporarily adopts the namwe Spider-Woman.

In Spider-Verse Team-Up #3, while in hiding on a radiation-ravaged Earth inhabited by an alternate version of Peter's Uncle Ben, a grieving Mayday confesses to this Ben that she hopes  there are variants of her and her brother who are still together with their families. This was intended by the original Spider-Girl creative team as an 'out' for their loyal long-term readership, implying that the Mayday featured in the Spider-Verse event was herself just one of many similar variants and not necessarily the 'original' that Marvel had promoted for twelve years. Spider-Verse scribe Dan Slott would go on to strongly contest this on message forums.

Spider-Island 
In the Secret Wars Battleworld version of Spider-Island, Mary Jane, Carlie Cooper, Betty Brant, and Sharon Carter were mutated into spider monsters by the Spider Queen and were used as bait for the resistance, as they also had bombs and tracking devices implanted in them. Spider-Man, Agent Venom, and Iron Goblin manage to subdue them and use Curt Connors' Lizard formula to mutate them into reptilian humanoids which freed them from the Spider Queen's control while the Vision removed the bombs from them just before they exploded.

Spider-Man: Reign 
In the alternative future seen in Spider-Man: Reign, Mary Jane died of terminal disease due to prolonged exposure to Peter's radioactive body fluids, her last words being "Go..." as he leaped out of a window to respond to sirens. It is believed that Mary Jane was trying to say "Go get 'em, Tiger". After her death, Peter buried his red and blue costume with her, wearing a black suit until his retirement. However, with the coming of the Sinner Six (and thanks to some encouragement from the tentacles of the now-deceased Doctor Octopus), Peter reclaims his original suit from Mary Jane's coffin and returns to his life as Spider-Man. After the Six are defeated and the WEBB surrounding New York is destroyed, Peter visits Mary Jane's grave, assuring her that he will be with her again some day, but, for now, he still has his responsibility.

Spectacular Spider-Man magazine 
In the UK based Spectacular Spider-Man Magazine, which is aimed at considerably younger readers, Mary Jane is Peter's love interest, but possesses no existing knowledge of his dual identity. A look into the future revealed she eventually marries Peter and has a daughter with him, Mayday, who is active as Spider-Girl. This is the third official continuity to incorporate Spider-Girl into the mythology (besides Earth X and the Spider-Girl title).

Peter Porker, the Spectacular Spider-Ham 
Peter Porker, the Spectacular Spider-Ham, Tom DeFalco and Mark Armstrong's anthropomorphic parody of Spider-Man, features "Mary Jane Waterbuffalo".

Marvel Universe vs The Punisher 
After her husband becomes the first infected in an exposure of a chemical that turns humans into cannibalistic brutes, Mary Jane and Aunt May try to take refuge at a safe haven offered by a priest, though she is kidnapped by Stilt-Man. Through unknown means she is eventually returned to the side of Spider-Man (now dubbed 'Patient Zero') and joins his tribe, despite not being infected. After a few years she becomes pregnant with Patient Zero's child; late in her pregnancy she is abducted by the Kingpin and taken hostage. Patient Zero sends the Punisher to rescue her, but he is captured and tortured for the location of Patient Zero. Mary Jane threatens to kill herself so that she will not reveal Patient Zero's location, but the Kingpin calls her bluff. Eventually Deadpool creates a distraction that allows her to free Punisher, who annihilates all of the cannibals and kills Kingpin. Mary Jane is reunited with Patient Zero, but is left distraught when Punisher kills him. Grieving, she is sent away from Manhattan by Punisher.

Age of X 
When the Anti-Mutant group known as the Human Coalition decided to also target the Mutates, Peter send his pregnant wife Mary Jane away to France to ensure her safety.

Spider-Gwen 
In Edge of Spider-Verse #2 and the ongoing Spider-Gwen series, Mary Jane of Earth 65 is shown to be the leader of a band called the Mary Janes, of which Gwen is a member. The band becomes a national sensation via downloads, though due to Gwen's double-life as Spider-Woman, inner-turmoil strikes the band. After a failed search for a new drummer to replace Gwen, Mary Jane and fellow band member Glory beg her to come back. Eventually, she starts to suspect that Gwen is Spider-Woman, but her bandmates dismiss her claims. Her theory is proven correct when Gwen reveals her identity to them.

Spider-Man Loves Mary Jane 
In Spider-Man Loves Mary Jane, Mary Jane is still a teenager and the book is primarily a teen drama rather than a superhero comic book, although it takes place in a superhero universe with Spider-Man playing a prominent role. In this continuity, Mary Jane is the most popular girl at Midtown High (her high school in Queens, NY) and even has the title of homecoming queen. She is briefly infatuated with Spider-Man and the two go on a date. After their date, she realizes that she would much rather be with Peter Parker. The ongoing series was preceded by two four-issue limited series, Mary Jane and Mary Jane: Homecoming, intended to appeal to female manga readers and the fans of the Mary Jane novels.

Spider-Man: Fairy Tales 
Issue #1 of Spider-Man: Fairy Tales mimics the fairy tale of Little Red Riding Hood. In this version of the fairy tale, Mary Jane's character mimics that of Little Red Riding Hood, and Peter is one of the woodsmen. Peter is not very strong but he is fast, agile, and "can climb better than most anyone." Working together, Peter and Mary Jane manage to kill the evil wolf. The two later become engaged.

In issue #4, a gender-reversed version of Cinderella, Mary Jane is a servant girl in the house of Sir Osborn, and is in love with Peter Parker. Peter, in the Cinderella role, does not realize this and disguises himself as the "Prince of Arachne" to win the hand of Princess Gwendolyn. Mary Jane discovers Peter's secret identity and aids him.

Spider-Man: The Clone Saga 
In this alternate take on the Clone Saga, Mary Jane and Aunt May are infected by virus from the Jackal, but thankfully are cured by Peter and Ben Reily when near death. Mary Jane later gives birth to their daughter May, but Alison Mongrain kidnaps the baby. Luckily the baby is returned to them.

Spider-Man: Life Story 
Spider-Man: Life Story features an alternate continuity where the characters naturally age after Peter Parker becomes Spider-Man in 1962. In 1977, Mary Jane is Harry Osborn's fiancée and runs a discothèque called "Studio 54." When Peter attends one night to support her, she drunkenly lashes out at him for not taking action in his personal life after he questions her relationship with Harry, revealing that she knew Peter was Spider-Man in the process. A year later, Harry breaks up with her and leaves her with a massive fortune after he accidentally killed Peter's wife, Gwen Stacy. After Peter and Gwen's clones leave New York to begin a new life, she comforts Peter in his apartment.

By 1984, she is now married to Peter and gave birth to two twins named Benjamin and Claire. She grows intolerable of Peter's absences as Spider-Man as she takes care of the twins and the elderly May around the time where Peter acquires the black suit. After Peter nearly lets the symbiote take over him while attacking Kraven, she leaves him and takes the twins with her. For the next 11 years, she raises the twins as a single mother in Portland while Peter continues to be CEO of Parker Industries and Spider-Man in New York. After he allows his clone Ben Reilly to take over his life in 1995, he returns to her and the children.

In 2006, Peter returns to New York shortly after Morlun kills Ben to draw the vampire out to him and prevent Tony Stark from taking over his company. As Iron Man forces Peter to participate in the Civil War, Morlun arrives at the Parker residence in Portland and attacks the Parker family. After Benjamin deduces that Morlun is vulnerable when feeding off life force, he allows Morlun to briefly feed of him to protect his mother and allow Claire the chance to impale the vampire on a tree. While he survived the encounter, Morlun's attack cripples him for life. In 2019, Mary Jane and their children say goodbye to Peter for the last time before he goes into space and sacrifices himself to save the world from Doctor Doom's reign. During his final moments, he imagines Mary Jane telling him everything will turn out fine. Shortly after Peter's funeral, Mary Jane meets with the new Spider-Man, Miles Morales, and gives him Peter's original suit to give the hero a "fresh start" after Otto Octavius took control of his body.

Spider-Verse 
 In Edge of Spider-Verse #4, Sarah Jane appears as is the next-door neighbor of Patton Parnell (the universe's Peter Parker).
 In Earth-001, the Inheritors home dimension, Mary Jane Watson appears as a Great Hall Guard.

Infinity Wars 
During Infinity Wars, when the universe was folded in half, Mary Jane is fused with Marlene Alraune. She is the assistant of Peter Spector (Arachknight), who is the CEO of his company. Sometimes she aids him in some occasions, since she knows his secret identity.

Incredible Hercules 
In alternate universe where the Amazonia conquered the world and the females became the dominant gender, Mary Jane was a female version of Spider-Man wearing an identical costume to Spider-Girl and was part of the Avengers, which consisted of Spider-Woman (Mary Jane), Ms. Fantastic (Sue Storm), White Phoenix (Jean Grey) and Wolverine (Laura Kinney).

Ultimate Marvel 

This version of Mary Jane, first appearing in Ultimate Spider-Man #1, attends Midtown High School with Peter Parker and Liz Allan. Originally known as "Mary" to her friends, she later picks up the "MJ" nickname. Unlike the original MJ, Ultimate Mary Jane is a brilliant student and expresses her true feelings instead of masquerading as a party girl. She has an eruptive temper and has even physically attacked some of the bullies at her school, resulting in a detention. At one time, MJ had expressed her wish to become an actress, then a "teacher who cares". She now has an interest in journalism. She and Peter begin dating in Ultimate Spider-Man #13. In that issue she becomes the second person to learn of Peter's secret identity and the first Peter reveals it to. She mends Peter's spare Spider-Man costumes, once calling herself the Betsy Ross of superheroes. Although Peter and MJ love each other very much, Peter's Spider-Man identity places a strain on their relationship. The relationship is further complicated when Gwen Stacy enters their lives.

Later, Peter began to fear for Mary Jane's safety more than ever when the Green Goblin kidnaps her and flings her off the Queensboro Bridge in a twisted attempt to gain Peter's allegiance. MJ survives, but the experience leaves her traumatized. She later grows angry and jealous when she believes that a new girl, Gwen Stacy, has feelings for Peter. MJ ends their relationship in issue #32, although the pair soon reconciles in issue #41. When MJ's father reads her diary and finds her referring to something as the "bridge incident", he tells MJ that she is not allowed to see Peter anymore. Furious, she runs away to an old factory but Peter finds her. MJ's parents separate soon after.

In the Hobgoblin arc (#72-78), it was revealed that Harry and Mary Jane engaged in a brief romance around the same time Peter was bitten. Then, long after his father is gunned down as the Green Goblin, Harry tells her that Peter "killed his father". After realizing his life as a superhero will always endanger MJ, Peter ends their relationship in issue #77. Shortly thereafter, Mary Jane goes out with a character named Mark Raxton. After one date, however, she changes her mind, resolving instead to prove herself to Peter and to get him back. When Raxton asks what MJ finds so special about Parker, she simply replies "Everything". She has since shown difficulty in moving on from Peter and in dealing with the state of their friendship, especially after Peter has dated Kitty Pryde, but Peter has shown an interest in reconciling their differences, and becoming friends again.

As part of the Clone Saga arc, MJ is kidnapped from her bedroom by a facially disfigured clone of Peter Parker who is determined to give her powers so that she is no longer in danger from his enemies. He pumps in her bloodstream an unquantified amount of OZ. Upon learning this, she becomes very angry and transforms into a huge, red, goblin-type creature (referred to by Bendis as Ultimate Demogoblin). When the real Peter Parker and Spider-Woman show up, she calms down and resumes her original form, just in time for Peter to render his clone unconscious. MJ is taken to the Fantastic Four's Baxter Building and when she wakes up, she is afraid and angry, causing another transformation. She spots the Peter clone who is in the building, calms down once again and reverts to her normal self. She is then given what is believed to be a cure for the effects of the OZ formula.

During the epilogue of the Clone Saga arc, Peter and MJ rekindle their romance, much to Kitty's dismay. Although MJ seems physically cured, her ordeal has left her badly traumatized, and she suffers from panic attacks and is haunted by the scarred visage of Peter's disfigured clone. Sue Storm suggests that Peter keep a close eye on MJ and seek a psychiatrist to help her. In issue #107, MJ sees Peter talking to Kitty and it angers her. Her hand starts to tremble and her fingernails briefly become claws but she calms down, indicating that her cure might not be permanent or complete, but was never explored further. In issue #112, it is seen that Mary Jane daydreams a scene where she fights against Spider-Man and the Fantastic Four in her mutated form.

Mary Jane decides to actively pursue a career in broadcast journalism, and she begins a series of on-location webcast reports in New York with Peter as her cameraman. She constantly messes up her surname, causing her to lose her temper, much to Peter's amusement. She eventually helps Kitty Pryde track down Peter when he is captured and unmasked by The Shocker.

In Death of a Goblin, when Spider-Man asks why they cannot cure Harry and Norman, one of the S.H.I.E.L.D. agents tells Peter that the cure for OZ does not work. Later Mary-Jane's hand starts to transform, though she controls it.

The third Ultimate Spider-Man Annual deals with what is described as a "heavily controversial topic". Fans have speculated that this will prove to be Peter and MJ exploring a sexual relationship despite their young age; thus far, the only hints of sexual intercourse have been brief encounters interrupted by changes in circumstance (e.g., Aunt May bursting into the room before they can kiss) and an attempt by Wolverine to make some sort of advance to her when he was briefly trapped in Peter's body. However, by the end of the story, Peter, despite knowing that he and MJ love each other, knew that they are not ready to go to the next level of their relationship, so the idea is postponed. That issue shows that Mary Jane has a knack as a detective, as she figured out that a police officer was on the take from someone, whom the NYPD has dubbed "Mysterio", and has the crooked cop set up surveillance equipment at the police department after Peter informed MJ of the police chase. Mysterio later escapes, but not before vowing to get even with Spider-Man.

In the six months since the events of Ultimatum, Peter and Mary Jane have once again broken up and become estranged. Mary Jane especially has become withdrawn and consumed in her work for the school webcast. Although Peter was now in a relationship with Gwen Stacy, he and MJ started to repair their friendship. Gwen eventually broke up with Peter, realizing he loved MJ more. Her appearance has also drastically changed as she now has much shorter hair and wears glasses. She would gradually ditch this look as she and Peter reunited as a couple. Peter would later seemingly perish in battle with Norman Osborn and the Sinister Six while saving his Aunt May's life. Mary Jane contemplated writing a tell-all exposé on how Fury had failed Peter after his death, but abandoned the idea when she saw Fury's genuine remorse at how he had failed to protect Peter.

When the Peter Parker of Earth-616 briefly crossed into the Ultimate universe, Gwen called Mary Jane to inform her about his presence, but even after seeing the older Peter leave the house, MJ was unable to bring herself to talk to him, running away when Peter noticed her.

It is eventually revealed that Peter somehow survived his fateful ordeal, waking up in an abandoned lab in San Francisco. Peter made his way back to New York and reunited with Mary Jane. The two dug up his grave to find no body in the casket. After reuniting with Aunt May and Gwen, and meeting up with Miles Morales, Peter helped his successor confront Norman Osborn, who indicated his OZ formula had effectively granted any infused with it immortality, himself and Peter included. Upon defeating Osborn, Peter elects to leave New York, with Mary Jane deciding to travel with him, and the two depart the city in her family car.

During the Secret Wars (2015) event and the tie-in Ultimate End, the Ultimate Universe was destroyed by a reality-breaking Incursion and formed part of the patchwork planet Battleworld. Despite appearances from Miles, 616 Peter, Ganke, Gwen and Aunt May, both Ultimate Peter and Mary Jane are absent from the story.

At the conclusion of the 2017 event Spider-Men II, it is revealed that the Ultimate Universe had been restored to the multiverse and that Peter has returned to New York with Mary Jane and had now fully reestablished himself as Spider-Man (Miles Morales having been integrated into Earth 616 history following the events of Secret Wars). Mary Jane makes a brief appearance contacting Peter to let him know he is late for a party.

King-Sized Spider-Man Summer Special 
Mary-Jane plays a starring role in Un-Enchanted Evening, a 23-page out-of-continuity short story in the King-Sized Spider-Man Summer Special. In the tale, MJ and her friends Millie the Model and Patsy Walker accidentally end up in the middle of a plot by Enchantress to kidnap and brainwash Clea, She-Hulk, Jean Grey, Scarlet Witch, and Patsy, turning them into her personal army. In the final confrontation between the heroines and Enchantress, MJ and Millie save the day when they distract her long enough for Clea to magically bind and gag her, effectively neutralizing her spell-casting abilities.

New Fantastic Four 
One of the Ages of Apocalypse created when Apocalypse warped the main universe, on this universe where the X-Men, Fantastic Four, Avengers and Doctor Doom were almost killed, Mary Jane is married to Peter, who is a member of the New Fantastic Four along with Wolverine, Hulk, Ghost Rider. She and Peter also have a daughter named May.

Silver Surfer: Requiem 
In the reality where Silver Surfer died due to coating breaking down, Mary Jane is seen where she is still married to Peter.

Spider-Man never existed 
In a world where Peter Parker had never existed, everyone who had known him in the main universe appears more successful, with Mary Jane becoming a successful actress and starring in the blockbuster film Rescue.

Sinister 60th
In the distant future, Mary Jane has booked a dinner for Peter on his 60th birthday, something she arranges every year, but every year he usually arrives late due to commitments to crime fighting. Peter communicates with MJ as he battles a new, younger Vulture, the two sharing a bit of banter, before Peter cuts her off to prevent a mugging. Mary Jane continues to wait for Peter until the restaurant prepares to close, she then learns on the news that Peter was shot while preventing the mugging and left for dead. She heads out to the hospital where she finds a great deal of New York have paid Peter a visit to show their gratitude. Mary Jane finally gets her turn to see him and they flirt some more before sharing a kiss, Mary Jane whispers something in Peter's ear, which Peter interprets as all the times she's saved him. Peter later leaves the ward to prevent another mugging, with Mary Jane angrily telling him to get back to bed. The medical staff all figure out that they are married, but are advised not to confirm it outright. Mary Jane and Peter return to their apartment that they share with their pet dog Daily, where Mary Jane admits to Peter that she ate his birthday cake, just as she does every year.

In other media

Television 

 Mary Jane Watson appears in the 1960s Spider-Man episode "The Big Brainwasher", voiced by Peg Dixon. This version is the niece of police captain Ned Stacy.
 Mary Jane Watson appears in the 1990s Spider-Man series, voiced by Sara Ballantine. She first meets Peter Parker in the episode "The Return of the Spider-Slayers" after May Parker sets Peter up on a blind date. At the time, Peter's primary love interest was Felicia Hardy and he did not look forward to meeting Mary Jane, but is left speechless upon meeting her. In the season three finale, the Green Goblin discovers Spider-Man's secret identity, kidnaps Mary Jane, and takes her to the George Washington Bridge. Spider-Man tries to save her, but she falls into a dimensional portal created by the Goblin's stolen time dilation accelerator and is presumed dead. In season four, she seemingly appears alive and well at the site of the bridge before resuming her relationship with Peter, who eventually reveals his secret identity and proposes to her. In season five, Mary Jane and Peter subsequently marry, but she is kidnapped by Hydro-Man. While in captivity, Mary Jane discovers she possesses water-based powers like her abductor, along with the fact that they are unstable clones created by Miles Warren. Not long afterward, Mary Jane and Hydro-Man's bodies begin to break down and disintegrate. In the series finale, Madame Web promises to help Spider-Man find the real Mary Jane.
 Mary Jane Watson makes a minor appearance in Spider-Man Unlimited, voiced by Jennifer Hale.
 Mary Jane Watson appears in Spider-Man: The New Animated Series, voiced by Lisa Loeb. This version is the on-and-off girlfriend of Peter Parker and has shorter hair than other incarnations due to production-related difficulties related to rendering long hair at the time.
 Mary Jane Watson appears in The Spectacular Spider-Man, voiced by Vanessa Marshall. Introduced in the season one episode "The Invisible Hand", she is part of an arranged date to Midtown High's Fall Formal set up by May Parker, which Peter initially dreads before he meets Mary Jane face-to-face. Afterwards, she transfers to Peter's school and enters a short romantic relationship with Mark Allan.
 Mary Jane Watson appears in Ultimate Spider-Man, voiced by Tara Strong. This version, like her Ultimate Marvel incarnation, is a childhood friend/best friend of Peter Parker and an aspiring journalist who dreams of reforming Daily Bugle Communications and rehabilitating Spider-Man's reputation due to J. Jonah Jameson's slander. During seasons one and two, she initially thinks that Peter and Spider-Man are separate individuals, attends Midtown High School as a student, and is friends with Harry Osborn and Flash Thompson. After making cameo appearances in season three, she returns in a supporting role in the fourth season. In the three-part episode "The Symbiote Saga", while Spider-Man, Captain America, and the former's fellow S.H.I.E.L.D. trainees combat the Carnage symbiote, Mary Jane joins Cloak and Dagger in traveling to Midtown High to help evacuate New York's citizens, but she gets transformed into the Carnage Queen and given a mind control device built by Hydra agent, Michael Morbius. Spider-Man, the Patrioteer, and Agent Venom encounter and subsequently fight her before Spider-Man destroys the mind control device. After the Carnage Queen attacks Morbius, the three heroes reveal their secret identities to her, allowing Mary Jane to regain control and break free of the Carnage symbiote, though traces of it remained within her. In the three-part episode "Spider Slayers", Dr. Curt Connors experiments on Mary Jane, allowing her to gain control of her symbiote and become Spider-Woman to help the Web Warriors fight the Spider-Slayers. In the two-part series finale, "Graduation Day", she attends S.H.I.E.L.D. Academy as a new student.
 An alternate reality version of Mary Jane based on the Marvel Noir incarnation appears as Spider-Man Noir's potential love interest and ally in the episode "The Spider-Verse" [Pt. 3]. In a flashback in the episode "Return to the Spider-Verse" [Pt. 2], she was killed as a result of a gang war between Joe Fixit and Hammerhead. The former tried to save her, but she gave her life to save others.
 Mary Jane Watson appears in the 207 Spider-Man series, voiced by Felicia Day. She first appears in the episode "Venom" as Midtown High School's mascot, helping Spider-Man defeat the Venom symbiote. She later makes a full appearance in "Amazing Friends".
 Mary Jane Watson appears in the Marvel Rising franchise, voiced again by Tara Strong. Like her Earth-65 counterpart, this version is part of a rock band and a friend of Gwen Stacy's.

Film 
 Mary Jane Watson appears in Sam Raimi's Spider-Man film trilogy (2002–2007), portrayed by Kirsten Dunst.
 In Spider-Man (2002), Mary Jane is introduced as Peter Parker's childhood and high school crush and ex-girlfriend of Flash Thompson. Desperate to escape her abusive, alcoholic father to pursue a happier future, she breaks up with Flash after they graduate and becomes a waitress to support her fledgling acting career. She dates Harry Osborn, Peter's best friend who knows of Peter's interest in her, but notes that Peter has never asked her out. She later develops an attraction to Spider-Man after the latter repeatedly rescues her, first from an attack by the Green Goblin and later from thugs in an alley, after which they share a kiss. She also grows closer to Peter, and in response, Harry breaks up with her. When the Goblin deduces Spider-Man's identity, he kidnaps Mary Jane and holds her hostage, but Spider-Man rescues her. Mary Jane later says she loves him, but Peter rejects her out of fear that a relationship between them would endanger her. The heartbroken Mary Jane realizes that her kiss with Peter reminded her of the one she shared with Spider-Man.
 In Spider-Man 2 (2004), Mary Jane, frustrated at Peter's reluctance to be with her and apparent lack of commitment, begins a relationship with John Jameson. Deciding that being without her is too high a cost, Peter resolves to abandon being Spider-Man despite Mary Jane having accepted a marriage proposal from John at the time. However, she comes to realize that she does not truly love John. After Doctor Octopus kidnaps Mary Jane, Spider-Man rescues her, during which he is unmasked in front of her, confirming what she suspected. Refusing to let the potential dangers get in the way of their happiness, Mary Jane breaks up with John and begins a relationship with Peter.
 In Spider-Man 3 (2007), Peter decides to propose to Mary Jane, but their future is complicated by her professional setbacks, a rivalry for Peter's affections in the form of Gwen Stacy, manipulation by the vengeance-seeking New Goblin, and Peter's behavioral changes brought on by his encounter with an alien symbiote. After he disposes of said symbiote, it falls into the hands of photographer Eddie Brock, turning him into Venom. He kidnaps Mary Jane, but Spider-Man defeats Venom, destroys the symbiote, and rescues Mary Jane. In the end, Peter and Mary Jane reconcile.
 In October 2012, Shailene Woodley was confirmed to play Mary Jane Watson in The Amazing Spider-Man 2 (2014), although she was cut from the final film (although briefly visible during the final scene as a background extra). Director Marc Webb explained the absence as "a creative decision to streamline the story and focus on Peter and Gwen and their relationship". Despite this, Woodley was planned to reprise the role for future installments, starting with The Amazing Spider-Man 3, until Sony's deal with Marvel Studios and Disney resulted in the Amazing Spider-Man series' cancellation and these plans being unrealized.
 Zoë Kravitz voices Mary Jane Watson in Spider-Man: Into the Spider-Verse. In the film's main universe, she was married to Peter Parker prior to his death. An alternate reality version of Peter (named Peter B. Parker) that ends up in the main universe was previously married to his version of Mary Jane, but they divorced due to Peter's fears of having children with her. After a run-in with the widowed Mary Jane and working with Miles Morales to return to his universe, the alternate Peter becomes inspired to win his former wife back. In the upcoming sequel, Across the Spider-Verse, it is revealed that Peter B. Parker and his Mary Jane had a daughter named May "Mayday" Parker. Mary Jane as Spinneret and her daughter Anna May-Parker / Spiderling from the 2015 limited series Amazing Spider-Man: Renew Your Vows will also appear in the film.
 In the live-action Marvel Cinematic Universe (MCU) films Spider-Man: Homecoming (2017), Spider-Man: Far From Home (2019) and Spider-Man: No Way Home (2021), the nickname "MJ" is used by a character named Michelle, an original character portrayed by Zendaya. Producer Kevin Feige described this as "a fun homage" to Spider-Man's past adventures and his past love. According to Spider-Man: Homecoming co-screenwriter John Francis Daley, MJ is intended to be a reinvention of Mary Jane Watson. In Spider-Man: No Way Home, the character's full name is revealed to be "Michelle Jones-Watson", bringing her closer to the comics counterpart, with the "Jones" portion of the surname originating from fan works.

Video games 

 Mary Jane Watson appears in The Amazing Spider-Man vs. The Kingpin. She is kidnapped by the titular villain and suspended over an acid tank. If Spider-Man defeats the Kingpin in a timely manner, he is able to save Mary Jane. If not, she will fall to her death, causing Spider-Man to vow revenge as Kingpin is arrested by the police. If Spider-Man loses, both he and Mary Jane die.
 Mary Jane Watson appears in Spider-Man's endings in Marvel Super Heroes and Marvel Super Heroes vs. Street Fighter.
 Mary Jane Watson appears in the 2000 Spider-Man video game, voiced by Jennifer Hale.
 Mary Jane Watson appears in Spider-Man: Mysterio's Menace.
 Mary Jane Watson appears in the 2002 Spider-Man film tie-in game, voiced by Cat O'Conner while Kirsten Dunst provides her likeness.
 Mary Jane Watson appears in the Spider-Man 2 film tie-in game, with Kirsten Dunst reprising the role. Similarly to the film, she is unaware of Peter's secret identity until the end. A brief additional storyline sees Peter being tempted to abandon his interest in Mary Jane due to the possibility of a new relationship with the Black Cat, but he eventually abandons this idea after realizing the importance of civilian life.
 The Ultimate Marvel incarnation of Mary Jane Watson appears in the Ultimate Spider-Man video game, voiced by Andrea Baker. This version helps Peter Parker research the villains he fights. In the Nintendo DS version, the player must save an unnamed character with Mary Jane's clothing and hair color.
 Mary Jane Watson appears in Spider-Man: Battle for New York.
 Mary Jane Watson appears in the Spider-Man 3 film tie-in game, voiced by Kari Wahlgren while Kirsten Dunst provides her likeness.
 Mary Jane Watson appears in Spider-Man: Web of Shadows, voiced by Dana Seltzer. She is caught in the crossfire of a fight between Venom and Spider-Man and ends up hospitalized. Despite this, she appears frequently throughout the game. In one of two Red Suit endings, she either joins Spider-Man in web-slinging across New York or fails to answer his phone call, during which he apologizes for his actions and begs for her forgiveness. In one of two "Black Suit" endings, she abandons him entirely for using the aforementioned suit in one while Spider-Man vows to reclaim her in the second.
 Mary Jane Watson appears in Spider-Man: Edge of Time, voiced by Laura Vandervoort.
 Mary Jane Watson appears in Lego Marvel Super Heroes, voiced by Tara Strong.
 Mary Jane Watson makes a cameo appearance in Lego Marvel's Avengers.
 Mary Jane Watson appears in Spider-Man Unlimited, voiced again by Tara Strong. She initially appeared as a non-playable character before several playable versions appeared in later updates.
 Mary Jane Watson appears in Marvel Avengers Academy. She appears as part of the "Spider-Man" event, and is later given the Iron Spider armor.
 Mary Jane Watson appears in Marvel's Spider-Man, voiced by Laura Bailey. Similarly to her Ultimate Marvel counterpart, this version is an investigative reporter for the Daily Bugle. She and Peter Parker were in a relationship months before the game's plot, with MJ being aware of his dual life as Spider-Man, but her frustrations with his over-protectiveness led to them breaking up. Her reporting duties cause her and Peter to cross paths after months without contact, and she offers to work with him as a full partner to investigate the power vacuum left behind by Wilson Fisk's arrest. In the process, she and Peter struggle with defining their relationship romantically and as a crime-fighting duo as their work brings them closer together before they eventually reconcile. Three months after the story's conclusion, she and Peter rekindle their relationship. She is also featured as a playable character during various investigative stealth gameplay segments of the story. In The City That Never Sleeps DLC, she assists Peter in stopping Hammerhead and the Maggia before leaving for Symkaria to report on and raise awareness for the civil war taking place there, with Peter eventually joining her as her photographer in Spider-Man: Miles Morales after entrusting New York's safety to Miles Morales, who had become the new Spider-Man and his crime-fighting partner.

Novels 
Romance novelist Judith O'Brien wrote two young adult novels featuring a teenage Mary Jane in 2003 and 2004, with illustrations by Mike Mayhew. This version is a shy, insecure girl who knew Peter Parker from elementary school and deals with anorexia and peer pressure.

 The first novel is a retelling of Spider-Man's origin story from Mary Jane's point of view. After learning Norman Osborn had injected a super drug known as OZ into the spider that bit Peter Parker and into sports drinks sold to their classmates, Mary Jane joins Peter in exposing Norman. The novel was successful with teenage girls who were not familiar with the comics, but was met with criticism from core fans due to its characterization and changing continuity.
 The second novel, Mary Jane 2, relates Peter and Mary Jane's continuing relationship and the emergence of Gwen Stacy, who develops feelings for Peter after Mary Jane gives her a makeover.

Collected editions

Spider-Man Loves Mary Jane

References

External links 

Characters created by John Romita Sr.
Characters created by Stan Lee
Characters created by Steve Ditko
Comics characters introduced in 1966
Fictional actors
Fictional characters from Queens, New York
Fictional characters who have made pacts with devils
Fictional college students
Fictional high school students
Fictional models
Marvel Comics female characters
Marvel Comics female superheroes
Marvel Comics film characters
Marvel Comics superheroes
Marvel Comics titles
Spider-Man characters
Teenage characters in film